Rubank, Inc., founded in 1926, was a large music publisher based in Chicago that is now, by way of acquisition, part of the Hal Leonard Corporation.  Rubank specialized in music aimed at the music education market.

History 
Rubank was born out of a three-way partnership of Finder & Urbanek of Chicago, a large music publisher, jobber, and manufacturer of specialties for the saxophone.  Finder & Urbanek incorporated and changed its name to Rubank, Inc. in 1927 when George Adam Finder (pronounced FEN der not FIND er; 1894–1962), one of the partners, sold his interest to the other partners, Harry Ruppel, Sr. (1888–1957) and Joseph James Urbanek (1894–1953).

Rubank eventually moved to Miami and was managed by Edward H. Wolske (President), Judith Ann Nelson (Secretary), and Janice Beth Ruppel (Vice President) (1948–2006).  The corporation, still an Illinois entity, filed for voluntary dissolution in 1988.

External links 
 Ruppert Memorial Library at VanderCook College of Music

Selected Rubank composers 
 Melvin H. Ribble (1870–1964)
 Harold Laurence Walters (1918–1984), chief composer for Rubank until his death
 Ervin Kleffman (1892–1987)
 Karl King (1891–1971)
 Himie Voxman (1912–2011)
 Victor Ewald (1860–1935)
 Hale Ascher VanderCook (1864–1949)
 Eugene De Lamater (1876-1943)
 Harvey S. Whistler (1907-1976)
 Herman A. Hummel (1892-1967)
 Robert MacArthur Crawford (1899–1961)
 Frederick Converse (1871–1940)
 Clifton Williams (1923–1976)

References 

Publishing companies established in 1926
Music publishing companies of the United States